The jugular venous pressure (JVP, sometimes referred to as jugular venous pulse) is the indirectly observed pressure over the venous system via visualization of the internal jugular vein. It can be useful in the differentiation of different forms of heart and lung disease.
Classically three upward deflections and two downward deflections have been described.
 The upward deflections are the "a" (atrial contraction), "c" (ventricular contraction and resulting bulging of tricuspid into the right atrium during isovolumetric systole) and "v" (venous filling).
 The downward deflections of the wave are the "x" descent (the atrium relaxes and the tricuspid valve moves downward) and the "y" descent (filling of ventricle after tricuspid opening).

Method

Visualization

The patient is positioned at a 45° incline,  and the filling level of the external jugular vein determined. The internal jugular vein is visualised when looking for the pulsation. In healthy people, the filling level of the jugular vein should be less than 4 centimetres vertical height above the sternal angle. A pen-light can aid in discerning the jugular filling level by providing tangential light.

The JVP is easiest to observe if one looks along the surface of the sternocleidomastoid muscle, as it is easier to appreciate the movement relative to the neck when looking from the side (as opposed to looking at the surface at a 90 degree angle). Like judging the movement of an automobile from a distance, it is easier for an observer to see the movement of an automobile when it is crossing the observer's path at 90 degrees (i.e., moving left to right or right to left), as opposed to coming towards the observer.

Pulses in the JVP are rather hard to observe, but trained cardiologists do try to discern these as signs of the state of the right atrium.

Differentiation from the carotid pulse

The JVP and carotid pulse can be differentiated several ways:
 multiphasic – the JVP "beats" twice (in quick succession) in the cardiac cycle.  In other words, there are two waves in the JVP for each contraction-relaxation cycle by the heart.  The first beat represents that atrial contraction (termed a) and second beat represents venous filling of the right atrium against a closed tricuspid valve (termed v) and not the commonly mistaken 'ventricular contraction'. These wave forms may be altered by certain medical conditions; therefore, this is not always an accurate way to differentiate the JVP from the carotid pulse. The carotid artery only has one beat in the cardiac cycle.
 non-palpable – the JVP cannot be palpated.  If one feels a pulse in the neck, it is generally the common carotid artery.
 occludable – the JVP can be stopped by occluding the internal jugular vein by lightly pressing against the neck. It will fill from above.

JVP waveform

The jugular venous pulsation has a biphasic waveform.
 The a wave corresponds to right atrial contraction and ends synchronously with the carotid artery pulse. The peak of the 'a' wave demarcates the end of atrial systole.
 The x descent follows the 'a' wave and corresponds to atrial relaxation and rapid atrial filling due to low pressure.
 The c wave corresponds to right ventricular contraction causing the closed tricuspid valve to bulge towards the right atrium during RV isovolumetric contraction.
 The x descent follows the 'c' wave and occurs as a result of the right ventricle pulling the tricuspid valve downward during ventricular systole (ventricular ejection/atrial relaxation). (As stroke volume is ejected, the ventricle takes up less space in the pericardium, allowing relaxed atrium to enlarge). The x' (x prime) descent can be used as a measure of right ventricle contractility.
 The v wave corresponds to venous filling when the tricuspid valve is closed and venous pressure increases from venous return – this occurs during and following the carotid pulse.
 The y descent corresponds to the rapid emptying of the atrium into the ventricle following the opening of the tricuspid valve.

Quantification
A classical method for quantifying the JVP was described by Borst & Molhuysen in 1952. It has since been modified in various ways. A venous arch may be used to measure the JVP more accurately.

Moodley's sign
This sign is used to determine which waveform you are viewing. Feel the radial pulse while simultaneously watching the JVP. The waveform that is seen immediately after the arterial pulsation is felt is the 'v wave' of the JVP.

Abdominojugular test

The term "hepatojugular reflux" was previously used as it was thought that compression of the liver resulted in "reflux" of blood out of the hepatic sinusoids into the inferior vena cava, thereby elevating right atrial pressure and visualized as jugular venous distention. The exact physiologic mechanism of jugular venous distention with a positive test is much more complex and the commonly accepted term is now "abdominojugular test".

In a prospective randomized study involving 86 patients who underwent right and left cardiac catheterization, the abdominojugular test was shown to correlate best with the pulmonary arterial wedge pressure. Furthermore, patients with a positive response had lower left ventricular ejection fractions and stroke volumes, higher left ventricular filling pressure, higher mean pulmonary arterial, and higher right atrial pressures.

The abdominojugular test, when done in a standardized fashion, correlates best with the pulmonary arterial wedge pressure, and therefore, is probably a reflection of an increased central blood volume. In the absence of isolated right ventricular failure, seen in some patients with right ventricular infarction, a positive abdominojugular test suggests a pulmonary artery wedge pressure of 15 mm Hg or greater.

Interpretation
An elevated JVP is the classic sign of venous hypertension (e.g. right-sided heart failure). JVP elevation can be visualized as jugular venous distension, whereby the JVP is visualized at a level of the neck that is higher than normal. The jugular venous pressure is often used to assess the central venous pressure in the absence of invasive measurements (e.g. with a central venous catheter, which is a tube inserted in the neck veins). A 1996 systematic review concluded that a high jugular venous pressure makes a high central venous pressure more likely, but does not significantly help confirm a low central venous pressure. The study also found that agreement between doctors on the jugular venous pressure can be poor, calling into question its reliability as a clinical decision-making tool. Similarly, a 2016 study examined the use of JVP measurements by clinical examination in the evaluation of central venous pressure in patients with heart failure. This study found that JVP examination was not consistent with actual central venous pressures, such that it was unreliable both for ruling in and ruling out heart failure. JVP measurement was especially unreliable in patients with high body fat. Additionally, it was noted that clinicians seemed to "extrapolate" JVP measurements from other, more easily examinable findings (like lung auscultation, body weight, heart rate, brachial blood pressure, and chest radiography findings).

The paradoxical increase of the JVP with inspiration (instead of the expected decrease) is referred to as the Kussmaul sign, and indicates impaired filling of the right ventricle. The differential diagnosis of Kussmaul's sign includes constrictive pericarditis, restrictive cardiomyopathy, pericardial effusion, and severe right-sided heart failure.

Certain wave form abnormalities, include cannon a-waves, or increased amplitude 'a' waves, are associated with AV dissociation (third degree heart block), when the atrium is contracting against a closed tricuspid valve, or even in ventricular tachycardia.  Another abnormality, "c-v waves", can be a sign of tricuspid regurgitation. The absence of 'a' waves may be seen in atrial fibrillation.

An exaggerated "y" wave or diastolic collapse of the neck veins from constrictive pericarditis is referred to as Friedreich's sign.

See also 
 Wiggers diagram

References

External links
 Clinical Examination page on JVP
 Normal jugular vein waves – Merck Manual

Cardiovascular physiology
Physical examination
Internal medicine
Interventional cardiology
Nephrology articles by importance